Woombye railway station is located on the North Coast line in Queensland, Australia. It serves the town of Woombye in the Sunshine Coast Region.

History
The station today consists of one platform with a wooden structure. In 2009, the platform was extended at both its northern and southern ends with scaffolding and plywood materials. Initially intended as an interim arrangement until a permanent extension was built, the temporary platform remains. Opposite the platform lies a passing loop and a disused goods yard.

Services
Woombye is serviced by City network services to Brisbane, Nambour and Gympie North. To relieve congestion on the single track North Coast line, the rail service is supplemented by a bus service operated by Kangaroo Bus Lines on weekdays between Caboolture and Nambour as route 649.

Services by platform

Stabling yard
In 2016 construction commenced on stabling facilities south of the station as part of the New Generation Rollingstock project.

References

External links

Woombye station Queensland Rail
Woombye station Queensland's Railways on the Internet

North Coast railway line, Queensland
Railway stations in Sunshine Coast, Queensland